The Esperanto jubilee symbol is a cultural symbol that was created in 1987 to mark the 100th anniversary of Esperanto. Because of its shape, the symbol is sometimes informally called the melon, egg or rugby ball.

With a Latin E on one side and a Cyrillic Э (for ) on the other, it can be interpreted as being inclusive of East and West. At the time, the Cold War was being waged between the United States and the Soviet Union, and they represented the largest enemies in the world.

The desire for a more modern-looking symbol for Esperanto arose when many Esperanto speakers felt that the Esperanto flag appeared too sectarian. Nowadays, many people use the Jubilee Symbol to represent the international Esperanto culture as a whole. For example, the Universal Esperanto Association and Esperanto-USA use it as their symbol.

Variations of the symbol involve the addition of a green star, the addition of the text "ESPERANTO", a national or local symbol, or a combination of the three. For example, the official logo of the Esperanto Association of Britain includes the green star and the word Esperanto.

See also
Esperanto symbols

Esperanto culture
Symbols introduced in 1987